Cho Kyu-hyun (born February 3, 1988), referred to as Kyuhyun, is a South Korean singer, musical theatre actor and television host. He debuted as a new member of boy group Super Junior (and later its sub-groups Super Junior-K.R.Y. and Super Junior-M as well as former member of SM Entertainment project group SM the Ballad) in May 2006. Apart from his group's activities, he has established himself as a musical actor, notably through his participation in the original and Korean versions of stage musicals including The Three Musketeers, Catch Me If You Can, Moon Embracing the Sun, Singin' in the Rain, The Days, Robin Hood, Werther, Mozart!, and The Man Who Laughs. He also cast in television show including Radio Star, We Got Married, Mamma Mia, Fluttering India and in the third, fourth, seventh, and eighth seasons of New Journey to the West. He debuted as a solo artist with his debut mini album, At Gwanghwamun, on November 13, 2014, making him the first Super Junior member to debut as a solo artist.

He is one of the first four Korean artists to appear on Chinese postage stamps.

Early life
Kyuhyun was born in Nowon-gu, Seoul, a northeastern part of the city. His father, Cho Young-hwan, worked for the Korean Housing Corporation before opening various educational institutes in Korea. Kyuhyun's mother, Kim Hanna, pursued business ventures such as establishing an art academy, as well as a guesthouse (MOM House) located in Myeongdong. Kyuhyun also has an older sister, Ara, a violinist who studied abroad in Vienna, Austria, before returning to Korea to teach the violin.

Kyuhyun was initially urged to study law by his parents and later said that it would have been his choice in career had he not become a singer. His original plans to go into law were abandoned once he joined a band in high school, where he realized his talents in singing. He went on to place third in the Chin Chin Singing Competition in 2005 and entered SM Entertainment the following year. He faced strong opposition from his father, but the latter agreed to grant his blessings if Kyuhyun was accepted into a prestigious university. Kyuhyun subsequently enrolled in Kyunghee University with a major in Post-Modern Music and received his bachelor's degree in 2013. In 2016, he completed his master's degree in Post-Modern Music at the same university with master's dissertation entitled, "A Study on the Current Status and Future Development of K-POP: K-POP Advancement Strategies to America and Europe based on the Success Stories of K-POP in Japan and China".

Career

2006–2009: Career beginnings 

Kyuhyun officially made his debut in 2006 as a new member of Super Junior (formerly Super Junior 05, the first generation of SM Entertainment's 12-member rotational boy band).

Kyuhyun made his first appearance as a part-time model of Super Junior in a news broadcast on May 23, where the group introduced their new single, U. He debuted a few days later on May 27 at SBS's I-Concert with "U", which was also the group's first comeback performance as a permanent group. The CD single "U" was released on June 7 and remained the group's most successful single until the release of "Sorry, Sorry" in 2009.

Shortly after his debut, Kyuhyun along with members Yesung and Ryeowook formed Super Junior's first sub-group, Super Junior-K.R.Y. The trio debuted on November 5 on KBS's weekly music program Music Bank. Kyuhyun subsequently released a solo track titled "Smile" for The tvN drama Hyena.

In 2008, Kyuhyun joined Super Junior Chinese sub-group Super Junior-M. The group debuted in China at the 8th Annual Music Chart Awards with the release of their first music video, "U" on April 8. The debut was followed by the release of the group's studio album, Me in selected provinces throughout China and Taiwan. Kyuhyun also collaborated with The Grace in early 2008 to perform "Just For One Day" (하루만) for The Grace's first album Hanbeon Deo, OK?.  Later that year, Kyuhyun, alongside member Ryeowook, featured in the song "Wish" (소원) in labelmate TVXQ's repackaged edition of Mirotic.

In 2009, Kyuhyun sang the remake of Yoo Young-suk's "7 Years of Love" (7년간의 사랑) for Yoo's 20th-anniversary tribute album. Kyuhyun first performed the song on the television program Yoo Hee Yeol's Sketch Book. On June 30, the song was released as a digital single as well as on Yoo's tribute album, with all proceeds donated to UNICEF. Following the success of his solo track, Kyuhyun alongside bandmate Donghae and actress Han Ji-min appeared in the music video "Happy Bubble," a commercial theme song for facial wash product Happy Bath on August 20.

2010–2013: Original soundtrack, S.M. The Ballad, Musical roles and Television roles 
On January 6, 2010, Kyuhyun released his solo track "Listen To You" for the Korean drama Pasta. The song peaked at number one on real-time music portal charts. On August 5, Kyuhyun released his third solo song "Hope, a dream that never sleeps" (희망은 잠들지 않는 꿈) for the television drama Baker King, Kim Tak Goo. 

In November, Kyuhyun along with label mates TRAX's Jay, SHINee's Jonghyun, and newly debuted singer Jino (now a member of Pentagon) formed the project group SM The Ballad. The group was described as SM Entertainment's vocal unit group, but the original members would only promote that winter together. The group released their debut album, Miss You on November 29 and debuted on the music program Inkigayo the day before. The group remained inactive until 2014, when Kyuhyun along with TRAX's Jay and Jino left S.M.The Ballad, leaving Jonghyun as the only original member in the group.

From December 15, 2010, to mid-January 2011, Kyuhyun rotated as D'Artagnan with TRAX's Jay in The Three Musketeers at Chungmu Art Hall in Seoul, where the singers co-starred with Yoo Jun-sang, Im Ki-jun, Kim Mu-yul and Dana Hong. His performances as D'Artagnan placed him first in an online poll for the Musical Rising Star Award at the 2010 Golden Ticket Awards.

In 2011, Kyuhyun contributed to group mate Siwon's drama Poseidon with the track "The Way to Break Up." The single was composed by Yoon Jong-shin and was also included in Yoon's monthly project album. Kyuhyun sang "Late Autumn" for Yoon's November monthly project later that year. He also appeared on KBS's music competition program Immortal Songs 2, replacing group mate Yesung on the show. Kyuhyun went on to win two rounds.

Kyuhyun was one of four fixed MCs on Super Junior's show Foresight, and in September he replaced fellow member Heechul as an MC on MBC's Radio Star. He later appeared on We Got Married as part of Fighting Junior, supporting fellow member Leeteuk and his on-screen wife actress Kang So-ra.

In 2012, Kyuhyun was cast as Frank Abagnale Jr., rotating with Um Ki-joon, Kim Jeong-hoon, Park Gwang-hyun and Key of SHINee in the Korean production of the Broadway musical Catch Me If You Can. The musical ran from March 28 to June 10 at the Blue Square Samsung Card Hall in Hannam-dong, Seoul.

From December 2012 to February 2013, Kyuhyun was again cast as Frank Abagnale Jr. for the re-run of Catch Me If You Can. From March 2013 to April 2013, he was cast as D'Artagnan for the re-run of The Three Musketeers.

In May 2013, it was announced that Kyuhyun would replace labelmate SHINee's Minho as the new MC of KBS 2TV's Mamma Mia. Later in June, Kyuhyun featured in labelmate Henry's debut solo song "Trap" alongside SHINee's Taemin.

In August, Kyuhyun graduated from Kyunghee University's postmodern music department with a bachelor's degree. He enrolled for his master's the following month. News sources reported the graduations of Kyuhyun and classmate Kim Yeon-ji as unusual examples of entertainment stars taking their academic work seriously, to which Kyuhyun remarked, "I worked hard to get into university, so I was very attached."

2014–2015: Solo debut with At Gwanghwamun and Fall, Once Again 
From January 18 to February 23, 2014, Kyuhyun starred in the musical adaptation of MBC's Moon Embracing the Sun at the Seoul Arts Center, alongside Girls' Generation's Seohyun.

In May, it was announced that Kyuhyun would star in the musical Singin' In The Rain as Don Lockwood, opposite Girls' Generation's Sunny. The musical was produced by SM C&C, a subsidiary of S.M. Entertainment, and ran from June 5 to 22 at Chungmu Art Hall in Seoul.

Later that month, Kyuhyun was cast in his fifth musical, The Days. He played the second lead character, Moo-yeong, a witty and free-spirited security guard at the Blue House. Kyuhyun rotated the character alongside actors Kim Seung-dae, Oh Jeong-hyuk, and Ji Chang-wook. The musical ran from October 21, 2014, to January 2015.

On November 13, 2014, Kyuhyun released his debut album, titled At Gwanghwamun, making him the first Super Junior member to debut alone. Kyuhyun made his first music show appearance on KBS2's Music Bank on November 14. Just 12 hours after the album's online release, the title track, "At Gwanghwamun", achieved an 'all-kill' by topping all nine digital Korean charts. All of the songs on his album eventually climbed to the top 10 on most music sites.

In December, it was announced that Kyuhyun would star as Prince Phillip for the musical Robin Hood. He rotated the role with Beast's Yoseob and actor Park Sung-hwan. The musical opened in January 2015 at the D-Cube Arts Center in Seoul.

In early 2015, Kyuhyun was cast in news-based KBS reality show Fluttering India (두근두근 인도) alongside TVXQ's Changmin, Shinee's Minho, CNBLUE's Jonghyun, Infinite's Sungkyu and Exo's Suho. Filming took place in Mumbai throughout February and the first episode was released on April 10, 2015.

On March 25, it was announced that singer-songwriter Lee Moon-se chose Kyuhyun to be his duet partner in his new album, New Direction. The duo's duet track, "She is Coming" was released on April 7.

On October 14, 2015, Kyuhyun's second EP, Fall, Once Again with the title track "A Million Pieces, was released."

In November 2015, Kyuhyun held his first solo concert And it's Fall Again, as part of SM Entertainment's concert series The Agit at the SMTOWN Theatre in SMTOWN's Coex Artium. Kyuhyun held six concerts, and tickets sold out in 46 seconds. In later that months, he released his next single, "The Day We Felt The Distance".

From November 2015 to January 2016, Kyuhyun played the lead role in the 15th-anniversary production of the musical Werther. He rotated the role with actors Um Ki-joon and Cho Seung-woo. Kyuhyun also participated in the OST album of the musical.

2016–2017: Japan promotions, Waiting, Still and military enlistment 
From April 11 to June 5, 2016, Kyuhyun held his solo tour in Japan, titled Super Junior Kyuhyun Japan Tour 2016 ~Knick Knack~. He performed in several cities, including Fukuoka, Sapporo, Osaka, Hiroshima, Yokohama, Nagoya, and Tokyo. Following his tour, Kyuhyun also released his debut Japanese single titled "Celebration ~Bridge to You~", on May 25.

On August 22, SM Entertainment announced that Kyuhyun would take a break from his activities due to vocal cord nodules. He underwent surgeries and temporarily halted his activities, including his performance in an ongoing musical that he was cast in, Mozart, as well as two weeks of recording on Radio Star.

In October 2016, it was announced that popular singer Sung Si-kyung would participated to composing in Kyuhyun's upcoming album and schedule to release within that year. Kyuhyun performed the new track at his concert Reminiscence of a novelist on October 29 to 30 at Ehwa Womans University and Busan from November 5 to 6 at Bexco Auditorium. His third EP, Waiting, Still, was released on November 10. The album includes the double title tracks, "Blah Blah" was produced by popular singer-songwriter Yoon Jong-shin and "Still" was produced by popular ballad singer Sung Si-kyung.

In December 2016, Kyuhyun confirmed he would release his first Japanese album One Voice on February 8, 2017 and held his second Japan tour, Super Junior-Kyuhyun Japan Tour 2017 ~One Voice~, from January 18 to March 5, 2017. One Voice reached number 1 on Oricon's daily chart and it ranked number 1 on Oricon weekly album chart in less than a week. With this album, Kyuhyun became the first solo foreign male artist from a group to top the chart.

In May 2017, it was announced that Kyuhyun would release a single titled 'Goodbye for Now' on May 24, a day before his enlistment date.

2019: Return from military, The Day We Meet Again, and King of Mask Singer 
Following his discharge from his mandatory military service on May 7, 2019, Kyuhyun held a fan meeting, Meeting Again Today, on May 19 at the Peace Hall in Kyung Hee University. He declined to return as an MC of Radio Star; but returned as a cast member of New Journey to the West for its seventh season, and joined the second seasons of Salty Tour and Kang's Kitchen. He also participated in Super Junior's 9th Album Time_Slip.

On May 14, 2019, Kyuhyun released his first single since his discharge, "Time with You". He also released a new EP, The Day We Meet Again, featuring the lead single "Aewol-ri", on May 20, 2019. Since his discharge, he also started his own YouTube channel KYU TV.

Kyuhyun also competed in King of Mask Singer, first appearing in episode 211 (broadcast on July 14, 2019) as "Jinie". Kyuhyun obtained 5 consecutive wins as "Jinie", becoming the first male idol to win the title of "Mask King". Kyuhyun covered a variety of songs during the competition including Kim Dong-ryool's "Should I Say I Love You Again?", Park Hyo-shin's "Breath", Lee Hi's "Breath", Naul's "Memory of the Wind", Wanna One's "Energetic", Yoon Jong-shin ft. Jung-in's "Uphill Road" and SHINee Kim Jong-hyun's solo song "Y Si Fuera Ella".

2020–2021: When We Were Us and Project: 季 
The song "All Day Long" was recorded by Kyuhyun as Part 3 of the OST for drama When The Weather is Fine. The song was released on March 16, 2020 and peaked at 142 in the Gaon Music Chart. The Super Junior member also recorded a remake version of the hit 1993 song "Confession Is Not Flashy" by Lee Seung Hwan for OST Part 4 of the popular tvN drama Hospital Playlist. The remake was released on April 3, 2020 and peaked at 8 on the Gaon Music Chart. Kyuhyun's remake of "Confession Is Not Flashy" was also nominated for the 30th Seoul Music Awards for Best OST.

In June 2020, Kyuhyun along with his fellow members of Super Junior K.R.Y released their first Korean EP since their debut in 2006 titled When We Were Us (EP) (푸르게 빛나던 우리의 계절). The album peaked at 1 on the Gaon Music Charts.

On July 23, 2020, Kyuhyun released the music video for his single "Dreaming" as the first part of his Project: 季 series.  According to the concept of this project, Kyuhyun plans to release a single for each season for a year with "Dreaming" been the single which represents Summer season.

On August 23, 2020, Toon Studio unveiled the OST "The Moment My Heart Flinched" recorded by Kyuhyun for the webtoon She Is My Type. The song peaked at 5 in the Gaon Music Chart.

The second single from Kyuhyun's Project: 季 series was released on October 8, 2020, and is titled as "Daystar".  "Daystar" represents the Autumn season and the music video stars actor Yoo Yeon Seok.

On January 13, 2021, EMK Musical unveiled the cast teaser for the musical "Phantom" in which Kyuhyun has been cast in the titular role of "Phantom" alongside Park Eun-tae, Kai, and Jeon Dong-seok. "Phantom" is a musical based on Gaston Leroux's iconic 1909 novel "The Phantom of the Opera (Le Fantôme de l'Opéra)". Ticketing for the musical began on January 19, 2021, and is set to run from March 17, 2021, to June 27, 2021.

Kyuhyun returned with his new series 2021 Project: 季, starting with the first single "Moving On", released on January 26, 2021, representing the winter season. The music video stars actor Gong Myung and actress Chae Soo Bin.

The second single from the 2021 Project: 季 series, titled "Coffee", was released on April 13, 2021, representing the spring season.

The third single from the 2021 Project: 季 series, titled "Together", was released on July 5, 2021, representing the summer season.

Kyuhyun released his fourth EP, Love Story (4 Season Project 季), featuring the lead single "Love Story", on January 25, 2022, to conclude the 2021 Project: 季 series.

2022–present: Soundtrack songs and comeback with Super Junior 
The OST recorded by Kyuhyun for the drama Forecasting Love and Weather, titled "Promise You" was released on March 6, 2022. Kyuhyun also recorded an OST titled "Departure from a Country" for the drama Sh**ting Stars, which was released on May 21, 2022.

Artistry

Voice 
Kyuhyun is a tenor, with a range spanning four octaves.

Personal life
Kyuhyun is one of the six Super Junior members who are Christians.

Car accident
On the early morning of April 19, 2007,  Kyuhyun along with Super Junior members Leeteuk, Shindong, Eunhyuk, and two managers were hospitalized due to a serious car accident while returning from a Super Junior Kiss the Radio show. The front tire reportedly burst, causing the car to hit a guard rail, spin twice, and flip over. Kyuhyun, who was sitting behind the driver's seat, suffered the most serious injuries including a fractured hip, broken ribs, and facial scratches and bruises. He subsequently developed pneumothorax from a broken rib piercing his lungs and remained in a coma for four days.

The doctor treating Kyuhyun at the time said that in order to repair Kyuhyun's pierced lungs he would have to pierce a hole into his neck, thus ending his career as a singer. Kyuhyun's father, who once vehemently opposed his son's career, was the first to immediately reject the operation, stating that Kyuhyun would rather die than not be able to sing. He pleaded that the doctor find another way to repair his son's lungs. In spite of this, doctors insisted that even with the surgery Kyuhyun "had about a 20 percent chance to live." After fierce debate between his parents and doctors, another surgeon named Dr. Wang Youngpil suggested an alternative operation that would instead make an incision in the ribs.

Kyuhyun spent six days in the ICU before he was transferred to a regular hospital room. After being moved, Kyuhyun no longer needed support from a respiratory machine, but he was not able to walk on his own until one month after the accident. He was discharged on July 5, 2007, after 78 days.

Vocal cord surgery
On August 23, 2016, Kyuhyun underwent vocal cord surgery to treat his vocal chord nodules. He subsequently took a break from all activities during recovery.

Military enlistment
On May 25, 2017, Kyuhyun began his mandatory military service. He received training at the Nonsan Army Training Center for four weeks before fulfilling his military duty as a social service worker. Kyuhyun is the last member of Super Junior to begin military service. Kyuhyun was discharged on May 7, 2019.

Commercial endorsements
Together with Super Junior and Super Junior-M, Kyuhyun has endorsed various brands such as Pepsi, Yamaha, 12Plus, SPAO, Kyochon Chicken, LG phone, Tony Moly, Lotte Duty Free, and Bonrich. He was also the main spokesperson for Masita Seaweed from 2011 to 2016.

In 2013, Kyuhyun and label mates Yoona, Minho, Sulli, Seohyun, and Siwon were appointed as the main models for SK Telecom.

In 2016, Kyuhyun was chosen to be the representative of Samdasoo mineral water along with Girls' Generation's Taeyeon.

In 2022, Kyuhyun appeared in a commercial for Terra, a brand of Korean beer by HiteJinro. He appeared with Sunmi whom he was a judge with in the reality show 'Sing Again 2', and participating contestants Kim Ki-tae, Kim So-yeon, Yun Seong.

Discography

 One Voice (2017)

Filmography

Film

Web series

Television shows

Web shows

Musical theatre

Ambassadorship 
 ACRC Public Relations Ambassador (2021)

Concert and tours
 And It's Fall Again (2015)
 Super Junior Kyuhyun Japan Tour 2016 ~Knick Knack~ (2016)
 Reminiscence of a novelist (2016)
  (2017)
 Super Junior-Kyuhyun Special Event ~Lover's Concerto~ (2022)

Awards and nominations

References

External links

 Official Korean Website 

 
1988 births
Living people
Japanese-language singers of South Korea
Mandarin-language singers of South Korea
Male actors from Seoul
Singers from Seoul
Singers with a four-octave vocal range
South Korean male idols
South Korean pop singers
South Korean male singers
South Korean rhythm and blues singers
South Korean tenors
South Korean male film actors
South Korean male musical theatre actors
South Korean male television actors
South Korean television presenters
South Korean radio presenters
Super Junior members
Super Junior-K.R.Y. members
Super Junior-M members
Kyung Hee University alumni
21st-century South Korean singers
South Korean Christians